Agiaon is a village and corresponding community development block in Bhojpur district of Bihar, India. As of 2011, its population was 4,801, in 835 households. The total block population was 148,373, in 23,117 households.

Demographics 
Agiaon is a rural block with no large urban centres. In 2011, its sex ratio was 920 females to every 1000 males, which was higher than the Bhojpur district average of 907. The sex ratio was higher in the 0-6 age group, with a ratio of 950, which was above the district ratio of 918. Members of scheduled castes made up 16.68% of block residents (compared with the district-wide 15.59%) and members of scheduled tribes made up 0.03% (district-wide 0.51%). The block's literacy rate was 67.90%, which was lower than the district-wide 70.47%. There was a 27.75% gender literacy gap in the block, with 81.15% of men but only 53.40% of women able to read and write (the district-wide gap was 23.71%).

Most of Agiaon block's workforce was employed in agriculture in 2011, with 30.54% of workers being cultivators who owned or leased their own land and another 47.60% being agricultural labourers who worked someone else's land for wages. 5.36% were household industry workers, and the remaining 16.50% were other workers. Most workers in the block were men: 37,986 were male and 17,121 were female.

Villages 
Agiaon block contains the following 72 villages:

See also
 Narayanpur

References 

Villages in Bhojpur district, India